Paul Price is an American football coach.  He served as the head football coach at West Virginia University Institute of Technology in Montgomery, West Virginia from 1996 to 1998 and at Concord University in Athens, West Virginia from 2016 to 2019.

Head coaching record

References

External links
 Concord profile

Year of birth missing (living people)
Living people
Concord Mountain Lions football coaches
West Virginia Tech Golden Bears football coaches
West Virginia Wesleyan Bobcats football coaches
West Virginia Wesleyan Bobcats football players